The India national cricket team toured Australia in the 1980–81 season to play 3 Test matches. The series was drawn 1-1.

Test series summary

First Test

Second Test

Third Test
{{Test match
 | date =7–11 February 1981
 | team1 =
 | team2 =

 | score-team1-inns1 =237 (84 overs)
 | runs-team1-inns1 =Gundappa Viswanath 114 (222)
 | wickets-team1-inns1 =Dennis Lillee 4/65 (25 overs)

 | score-team2-inns1 =419 (156.3 overs)
 | runs-team2-inns1 =Allan Border 124 (265)
 | wickets-team2-inns1 =Dilip Doshi 3/109 (52 overs)

 | score-team1-inns2 =324 (109.1 overs)
 | runs-team1-inns2 =Chetan Chauhan 85 (198)
 | wickets-team1-inns2 =Dennis Lillee 4/104 (32.1 overs)

 | score-team2-inns2 =83 (48.4 overs)
 | runs-team2-inns2 =Doug Walters 18* (60)
 | wickets-team2-inns2 =Kapil Dev 5/28 (16.4 overs)

 | result =India won by 59 runs
 | venue =Melbourne Cricket Ground, Melbourne
 | umpires =Mel Johnson (Aus) and Rex Whitehead (Aus)
 | motm = Gundappa Viswanath (Ind)
 | report =Scorecard
 | toss =Australia won the toss and decided to field
 | rain =
 | notes = Allan Border (Aus) passed 2,000 runs in Tests.
Dennis Lillee (Aus) claimed his 250th wicket in Tests.
}}

 ODI series 
India also competed in a tri-nation ODI tournament involving Australia and New Zealand. India won three of their ten round robin matches but failed to qualify for the five-match final in which Australia defeated New Zealand 3–1.

Further reading
 Chris Harte, A History of Australian Cricket'', Andre Deutsch, 1993

Annual reviews
 Playfair Cricket Annual 1981
 Wisden Cricketers' Almanack 1981

References

External sources
 Tour home at ESPNcricinfo archive
 India Tour of Australia & New Zealand 1980-81 at test-cricket-tours.co.uk
 

1980 in Australian cricket
1980 in Indian cricket
1980–81 Australian cricket season
1981 in Australian cricket
1981 in Indian cricket
1980-81
International cricket competitions from 1980–81 to 1985